The 1951 Utah Redskins baseball team represented the University of Utah in the 1951 NCAA baseball season. The Redskins played their home games at Derks Field. The team was coached by Pete Carlston in his 2nd year at Utah.

The Redskins won the District VII playoff to advance to the College World Series, where they were defeated by the Tennessee Volunteers.

Roster

Schedule 

! style="" | Regular Season
|- valign="top" 

|- align="center" bgcolor="#ccffcc"
|  || April 23 ||  || Derks Field • Salt Lake City, Utah || 14–2 || 0–0 || –
|-

|- align="center" bgcolor="#ccffcc"
|  || May 10 || BYU || Derks Field • Salt Lake City, Utah || 12–3 || 0–0 || –
|- align="center" bgcolor="#ccffcc"
|  || May 11 || at BYU || Timpanogos Park • Provo, Utah || 12–3 || 0–0 || –
|-

|- align="center" bgcolor="#ccffcc"
| 15 ||  || at  || Unknown • Greeley, Colorado || 20–1 || 14–1 || –
|- align="center" bgcolor="#ccffcc"
| 16 ||  || at Colorado State || Unknown • Greeley, Colorado || 11–6 || 15–1 || –
|-

|- align="center" bgcolor="#ccffcc"
| 17 || June 13 || vs Tennessee || Omaha Municipal Stadium • Omaha, Nebraska || 7–1 || 16–1 || –
|- align="center" bgcolor="#ffcccc"
| 18 || June 14 || vs Southern California || Omaha Municipal Stadium • Omaha, Nebraska || 2–8 || 16–2 || –
|- align="center" bgcolor="#ccffcc"
| 19 || June 15 || vs Texas A&M || Omaha Municipal Stadium • Omaha, Nebraska || 15–8 || 17–2 || –
|- align="center" bgcolor="#ffcccc"
| 20 || June 16 || vs Tennessee || Omaha Municipal Stadium • Omaha, Nebraska || 4–5 || 17–3 || –
|-

Awards and honors 
Jim Cleverly
 American Baseball Coaches Association First Team All-American

References 

Utah Utes baseball seasons
Utah Utes baseball
College World Series seasons
Skyline Conference (1938–1962) baseball champion seasons
Utah